Das Pop was a Belgian band founded in Ghent by school friends Reinhard Vanbergen, Niek Meul, Lieven Moors and Bent Van Looy.

Biography
Das Pop was initially called Things to Come, but the band changed its name to Das Pop when Tom Kestens joined the band. In 1998, they won Belgium's influential HUMO's Rock Rally contest.

Tom Kestens and Lieven Moors later left the band, and in 2007 New Zealander Matt Eccles (formerly drums in Betchadupa) joined the band as the new drummer. In January 2008 Das Pop released "Fool For Love" on UK independent label Prestel Records. The release featured remixes from French DJ SebastiAn and Yuksek, and was called a "monumental new single from the Belgian electro band" in the Culture section of UK newspaper The Sunday Times.

In 2008 Das Pop toured extensively with other acts including Soulwax, The Feeling, Gossip, The Kills, Alphabeat and Justice. They also played at many festivals including Rockness, V Festival, Reading and Leeds, Pukkelpop as well as Lovebox and Glastonbury where they played three sets in one day across three different stages.

In 2010 the song "Never Get Enough" was featured in Gossip Girl episode "Goodbye, Columbia".

In 2011 the band recorded their album "The Game" in Hoboken, New Jersey at Water Music Studios, produced and engineered by Terry Manning. The album was mixed in Manning's Nassau, Bahamas studio.

Bent van Looy toured as MC through Europe along concert halls like Ethias Arena, Brixton Academy, Telefonica Open de Madrid, Palacio da bolsa and many others with Soulwaxmas. That is the Christmas party organised by Soulwax

Das Pop member Reinhard Vanbergen produced albums for The Hickey Underworld, Drums Are For Parades and Goose. Entropology, the debut album of School is Cool, was recorded at Motormusic Studios and was also produced & mixed by Vanbergen. The album was released in 2011.

On 24 November 2012, Van Looy announced a break. The band would not perform for a year. The last concert was given on 20 December that year in Eeklo.

Discography

Albums

Singles

References

External links

Belgian rock music groups
Wonky pop musical groups